Pey Posht (also Romanized as Peyposht and Pey-ye Posht; also known as Payi Pusht) is a village in Ramkan Rural District, in the Central District of Qeshm County, Hormozgan Province, Iran. At the 2006 census, its population was 1,766, in 446 families.

References 

Populated places in Qeshm County